Siska is a 1962 Swedish drama film directed by Alf Kjellin and starring Harriet Andersson, Lars Ekborg and Mona Malm. It was shot at the Råsunda Studios in Stockholm. The film's sets were designed by the art director Bibi Lindström.

Cast
 Harriet Andersson as 	Siska Olofsson
 Lars Ekborg as 	Bo Myrman
 Mona Malm as 	Louise
 Gertrud Fridh as 	Annabella Myrman
 Tor Isedal as 	Roland
 Peter Kylberg as Party guest
 Carl-Olof Alm as Passenger on Subway 
 Ingrid Backlin as 	Midwife 
 Bengt Bedrup as 	TV Announcer 
 Jessie Flaws as Lillemor 
 Göran Graffman as 	A-son 
 Björn Gustafson as Conscription Buddy 
 Eivor Landström as Lying-in Woman 
 Jan-Erik Lindqvist as 	Captain 
 Fredrik Ohlsson as 	B-son

References

Bibliography 
 Qvist, Per Olov & von Bagh, Peter. Guide to the Cinema of Sweden and Finland. Greenwood Publishing Group, 2000.

External links 
 

1962 films
Swedish drama films
1962 drama films
1960s Swedish-language films
Films directed by Alf Kjellin
1960s Swedish films